Parc-llyn (also known as Parcllyn) is a village in the  community of Aberporth, Ceredigion, Wales, which is 74.4 miles (119.7 km) from Cardiff and 194.2 miles (312.5 km) from London. Parcllyn is represented in the Senedd by Elin Jones (Plaid Cymru) and the Member of Parliament is Ben Lake (Plaid Cymru).

References

See also
List of localities in Wales by population

Villages in Ceredigion